Sharon R. (Lady) Wilson (born September 25, 1948) is the second female President of the Senate of the Commonwealth of the Bahamas. She is the only person, male or female, to have served two non-consecutive terms in that office.

She was born in Nassau, Bahamas, and attended public schools there until 1961. She then attended St. John's College, graduating in 1966.

Wilson attended Florida Memorial University where she received her BA, with honors, in 1971. She earned her M.SC. in 1979 from the University of Miami. She was a chief magistrate for the Commonwealth, and was the President of the Senate from May 2002 until May 2007, and then again from May 2012 until the present.

References 

Presidents of the Senate of the Bahamas
Members of the Senate of the Bahamas
People from Nassau, Bahamas
Florida Memorial University
University of Miami alumni
1948 births
20th-century Bahamian women politicians
20th-century Bahamian politicians
Living people